Cancer Therapy Advisor (formerly Chemotherapy Advisor) is an online resource and quarterly medical news publication for oncology healthcare professionals, with updated treatment regimens for patients with cancer and live medical conference coverage.

Background
Launched in January 2012, Cancer Therapy Advisor is owned by Haymarket Oncology, a subsidiary of Haymarket Media based in New York City and New Jersey.

American medical websites
Oncology journals
English-language journals
Magazines published in New York City
Publications established in 2012
Companies based in New York City